Iraq–Sri Lanka relations describe diplomatic and other relations between the nations of Iraq and Sri Lanka. The countries were historically close under the Iraqi Ba'athist regime. Iraq was the largest buyer of Sri Lankan tea during the reign of Saddam Hussein.  Ties between Sri Lanka and Iraq were disrupted during the Iraq War. However, in 2018 Iraq re-emerged as the largest buyer of Sri Lankan Tea. Sri Lanka has an embassy in Baghdad and Iraq has an embassy in Colombo.

History
During the late 1970s, Sri Lanka was suffering due to the OPEC oil-price increases. Sri Lankan foreign reserves shrank, creating an oil crisis. In 1975, Prime Minister Sirimavo Bandaranaike went to Iraq to meet with Hussein to discuss this issue. Hussein agreed to supply 250,000 tons of oil on a four-year deferred payment basis, at a low rate of interest to Sri Lanka. When a cyclone hit a village in Sri Lanka, local authorities asked help from Hussein. He readily obliged and sponsored construction of an entire village with some 100 houses, including a school. Grateful families living in the village hung his picture in their houses out of respect. When sanctions were imposed on Iraq, Sri Lanka took advantage of the Oil-for-Food Programme and continued exporting tea to Iraq. Sri Lanka donated 100 tons of tea to Iraq. Hussein's execution caused widespread anger and protest among Sri Lankans.

See also 
 Foreign relations of Iraq 
 Foreign relations of Sri Lanka
 Saddam Hussein Nagar, Sri Lanka, a town in Sri Lanka named after former Iraqi President, Saddam Hussain.

References

 
Bilateral relations of Iraq
Iraq